Skylar Schneider (born September 3, 1998) is an American cyclist, who currently rides for American amateur team .

Career
As a junior at the 2016 UCI Road World Championships, Schneider finished second in the road race, while taking fourth in the time trial.

At the 2017 Pan American Road Cycling Championships, she took bronze in the road race.

Schneider won the sixth and final stage at the 2017 Thüringen Rundfahrt der Frauen.

Major results

2015
 1st Stage 11 Tour of America's Dairyland
 3rd Time trial, National Junior Road Championships
 7th Overall Tulsa Tough
2016
 National Junior Road Championships
1st  Road race
2nd Time trial
 1st Rochester Twilight Criterium
 UCI Junior Road World Championships
2nd  Road race
4th Time trial
 2nd Overall Tulsa Tough
 3rd Sunny King Criterium
 3rd TD Bank Mayor's Cup
2017
 1st Stage 6 Thüringen Rundfahrt der Frauen
 3rd  Road race, Pan American Road Championships
 3rd Overall Tulsa Tough
 3rd Rochester Twilight Criterium
 7th Overall Tour of America's Dairyland
1st Stage 4
2018
 1st Stage 3b (TTT) Healthy Ageing Tour
 5th Volta Limburg Classic
 5th RaboRonde Heerlen
 8th Overall Tulsa Tough
 10th Ridderronde Maastricht
2019
 3rd Overall Tulsa Tough
2021
 1st  Overall Joe Martin Stage Race
1st  Points classification
1st Stages 1 & 4
 1st Overall Tulsa Tough
1st Stages 1 & 3
 1st Overall Intelligentsia Cup
1st West Dundee River Challenge
1st Mundelein Grand Prix p/b Lennar
1st Lombard Cycling Classic p/b DuPage Sports Commission
1st Dennis Jurs Memorial Race
1st Northwestern Medicine Lake Bluff Criterium
1st William Blair Grand Prix at Goose Island Beer Co.
 1st Boise Twilight Criterium
 1st Littleton Twilight Criterium
 1st Spartanburg Criterium
 1st Athens Twilight Criterium
 1st Tour de Francis Park p/b Urban Chestnut Brewery
 1st Giro della Montagna p/b Emerson
 4th Overall Armed Forces Association Cycling Classic
 5th Overall Tour of America's Dairyland
1st Tour of Hartland
1st Otto Wenz Cafe Hollander Downer Classic
1st Shorewood Criterium Cycling Classic
1st Highlands Criterium
1st Cafe Hollander Tosa Village Classic
2022
 1st Sunny King Criterium
 8th Overall Joe Martin Stage Race
1st Stage 1

References

External links

Living people
American female cyclists
1998 births
21st-century American women